Hexarthrius melchioritis is a species of beetle, which belongs to the family of stag beetles (Lucanidae) in the group Scarabaeoidea. 

It was first described in 1954 by French entomologist, Eugène Séguy. The species is endemic to northern Myanmar.

Appearance
A large (males 35–71 millimeter), glossy, brown-black stag beetle. The male's jaws are long, quite straight, with an inward-facing tooth just outside the middle, with scattered, small teeth along the inner edge, pointed at the tip. This species is slimmer in build than most other Hexarthrius species. The antennas are quite thin, with a small, six-joint fan. The pronotum is rectangular, much wider than long. The female is completely black, much smaller than the male, with no strikingly enlarged jaws.

Life cycle
The larvae develop in rotten tree trunks.

Systematic classification 

 Order Beetles, Coleoptera
 Sub-order Polyphaga
 Superfamily Scarabaeoidea
 Family Stag beetles, Lucanidae Latreille, 1806
 Tribe Lucanini Latreille, 1806
 Genus Hexarthrius Hope, 1842 – 15 species
 Hexarthrius melchioritis Seguy, 1954

References 

Lucanidae
Beetles described in 1954
Insects of Myanmar